Tjong or Tjongsfjord is a village in the municipality of Rødøy in Nordland county, Norway. The village is located along the Tjongsfjorden, east of the municipal center of Vågaholmen. The local church, Tjongsfjorden Church, serves all of northeastern Rødøy.

References

Rødøy
Villages in Nordland